Arundhathi was a 2019 Tamil-language supernatural television drama that aired on Sun TV. It premiered on 13 May 2019 and ended on 9 November 2019. Subalakshmi Rangan, Darshak Gowda and Nikitha Rajesh play leading roles in the series.

Synopsis
Shanmugam lands in Chennai along with his fiancée Sulekha to take his mother Eeswari to the USA, where he has settled. He becomes possessed by the spirit of a girl who was killed.

Cast

Main
 Darshak Gowda as Arundhadhi/  Shanmugam(Soul enters into Shanmugam's body)
 Nikitha Rajesh as Deivanai Shanmugam
 Subalakshmi Rangan as Arundhathi (A Spirit)
Darshak Gowda Shanmugam Arundhati 
Soul entire into as 
Subalakshmi Rangan Arundhati
Deianai Shanmugam
Sualaksmhmi Rangan Arundhati
Sarshak Gowda Shanmugam Arundhati

Recurring 
 Sonia as Revathy
 Poovilangu Mohan as Somasundaram, Kathirvel's father
 Ruthu (1-51) and Meera Krishna (53-154) as Eshwari, Shanmugam's mother 
 Akhila as Rekha, Kathirvel's wife
 Shilpa Ravi as Sulekha, Shanmugam's ex-fiancée
 Prakash Rajan as Kathirvel
 J.Lalitha as Malathi, Kathirvel's mother
 Rohit Balaiah as Karthik, Kathirvel's brother
 Devipriya as Kanniga, Eshwari's sister
 Archana as Kannama, Eshwari's housemaid
 Kuhasini Gnanaseggaran as Sasha
 Sekar Raja as Aravind, Sasha's boyfriend
 Sivan Sreenivasan as Bhoopathi, Eshwari's brother
 Babitha as Uma Bhoopathi, Bhoopathi's wife
 Suhasini as Malli 
 Kumaresan as Muthu
 Sesu as Varadhi Kathirvel Shanmugam Arundhati Deianai Shanmugam

Casting
Subalakshmi Rangan was selected to portray Arundhathi.  Darshak Gowda was selected to portray the lead role of Shanmugam. Nikitha Rajesh was chosen to play Deivanai. Meera Krishna was selected to play Eshwari.

Production
 The series is produced by Sun Entertainment and Bodhi Tree Production.

International broadcast
The series was released on 13 May 2019 on Sun TV and also airs on Sun TV HD. The program was also broadcast internationally. 
 
 The program's episodes are released on YouTube channel Sun TV after original telecast.
 The drama episodes are also released on their app Sun Nxt.

References

External links 
 Official Website 

2010s Tamil-language television series
Sun TV original programming
2019 Tamil-language television series debuts
Tamil-language television shows
2019 Tamil-language television series endings